

Films

References

2017 in LGBT history
2017
2017-related lists